Rolling stock used on the London Underground and its constituent companies has been classified using a number of schemes. This page explains the principal systems for the rolling stock of the Central London Railway (CLR), the Underground Electric Railways Company of London (UERL), the District Railway (DR) and the Metropolitan Railway (MR). For information about individual classes of locomotives and other rolling stock, see London Underground rolling stock.

Electric Multiple Units
The numbering and classification of electric multiple unit stock on the London Underground is usually related to the type of line that the trains are used on in the central area of the network.

Sub-surface lines were built using the cut-and-cover tunnelling method and use trains of similar size to those on the National Rail network. These are the Circle, District, Hammersmith & City, Metropolitan (and formerly East London) lines.

Tube lines are deep-level lines, built to a more restricted loading gauge using circular tunnelling shields or tunnel boring machines. These are the Bakerloo, Central, Jubilee, Northern, Piccadilly, Victoria and Waterloo & City lines. Outside of the central area, both types of trains run on the surface.

Unit Classification
The method of classification depends on the type of line the train operates on:

Tube Stock
Tube Stock is classified by the anticipated year of delivery at the time of ordering.

This system was inaugurated by the London Passenger Transport Board (LPTB) with the 1935 Stock. The large number of broadly similar Tube trains built for the UERL during 1922-1934 were called (and are commonly still referred to as) Standard Stock (officially re-christened Pre-1938 tube stock upon rehabilitation), although there were many detail differences. They replaced the UERL's original Gate Stock (itself known as Standard Stock before the introduction of the then-new Pre-1938 tube stock), introduced for the opening of the Bakerloo, Piccadilly and Hampstead (Northern) lines and the replacement of the City & South London Railway's locomotive and carriage sets, the Watford Joint Stock of the Bakerloo, the Great Northern & City Railway's surface gauge stock, and the CLR's Tunnel Stock and Ealing Stock (which in turn comprised DMs of 1903 and 1915 vintage constructed to replace locos hauling trailers of 1900 vintage).

Sub-surface Stock
Sub-surface Stock is classified by a letter, usually issued sequentially, and which is sometimes followed by the last two digits of the year of delivery, e.g. G23 Stock
.
This system was commenced by the DR for its stock. When the LPTB was formed, the ex-Metropolitan Railway units were incorporated into this series (types MV, MW, T, V, VT and W). By 1960, most letters had been allocated, and the decision was taken to re-issue A (for the Amersham electrification) to the new Metropolitan stock. The next sub-surface types were built for the Circle and District lines, and the opportunity was taken to allocate C (for the Circle line) and D (for the District line) respectively, omitting B.

Types of Unit
On most lines, trains are formed from a pairing or triplet of units. Units are 'single-ended', where there is a driving cab at one end only, or 'double-ended', where there is a driving cab at both ends. In addition, some units have no driving cabs, and thus must always be included in the middle of a formation of units.

Car Classification
The different types of car used to make up electric multiple units are referred to by a series of codes, described below:

On most lines, the end cars of units are described as 'A' end cars or 'D' end cars ('B' end until the 1930s). In general, the 'A' end is the north or west end and the 'D' end is the south or east, but the reverse applies on the Bakerloo line. On lines with a loop at the end that allows trains to turn round (e.g. at Heathrow Terminal 4 on the Piccadilly line and Kennington on the Northern line), this system cannot apply rigidly.

Car Numbering
Each car carries its own unique number (although many numbers below 10000 have been reused by newer cars after the withdrawal of older trains), and unit numbers are not applied. Although car numbers have been allocated in a variety of different series over the years, two basic principles can be identified:
 A-end cars have even numbers and D-end cars have odd numbers; cars will usually be renumbered if they are turned to the opposite end. This principle was applied by the DR and continued by the LPTB.
 Cars within a unit usually either share the same last two digits, or one end uses the next odd digit after the other end's even digit; frequently when cars are swapped between units they will be renumbered to maintain this approach. This principle was introduced by the LPTB.

1931 Numbering Series
In 1931, the UERL began a major renumbering of all its multiple unit cars. The series was adopted by the LPTB in 1933 and renumbered stock inherited from the MR was incorporated into the UERL's series. The table below shows the number ranges used for the inherited stock and initially used by the UERL/LPTB for new stock (including the LPTB-designed M and N Stock and Q38 Stock DM cars - Q38 Stock trailers were allocated numbers in one of the new numbering series described later):

Notes: 
 Ex-MR hauled stock retained their original numbers as they did not conflict with any of the numbers allocated to the multiple unit stock; they were all numbered between 41 and 510 (511-519 were later allocated to cars converted from multiple unit to hauled stock).
 A 'Composite' car had both First and Third class seating. All Tube stock was Third class only; all ex-DR stock was Third class except those trailers identified as Composite. In the ex-MR ranges First class stock took the lowest numbers, then Composites, then Third class. The LPTB gradually declassified all stock to Third class, the process being completed in the early years of World War II.
 Some cars converted to Trailers after 1935 carried a '0' prefix to their numbers, as was applied to new-build trailer cars in this period. In some cases, such cars briefly retained their original DM numbers but with a '0' prefix before being renumbered into the appropriate range for trailers.

Later Developments
This standard number series proved to be short lived; from 1935 onwards a variety of different series have been used, so the current list of numbers looks rather random. The table below sets out the numbering systems used for each type of London Underground stock:

Notes and references

Notes

References

Bibliography

 
 
 
 

London Underground rolling stock